Agénor Altaroche (18 April 1811 – 13 May 1884) was a French journalist, chansonnier and man of letters, Commissioner of the Provisional Government for the Puy-de-Dôme in 1848, representative of that department to the 1848 Constituent Assembly.

Bibliography 
 Hoefer, Ferdinand, Nouvelle biographie générale : depuis les temps les plus reculés jusqu'à nos jours avec les renseignements bibliographiques et l'indication des sources à consulter, t.II, p. 227, Paris, Firmin-Didot frères, 1852-1856.
 Dictionnaire de biographie française par Michel Prévost, Henri Tribout de Morembert, J.C. Roman d'Amat, et al., Paris, Letouzey et Ané, 1936.
 Maitron, Jean, Dictionnaire biographique du mouvement ouvrier français, t.1, 1789-1864, De la Révolution française à la Première Internationale, Paris, Ed. Ouvrières, 1964.

External links 
 A. Altaroche, lyrics of the song Le Prolétaire published in L'Echo de la fabrique du 27 octobre 1833. This text appeared in the collection Chansons et Vers politiques (Paris, Ed. Pagnerre, 1835, 2nd ed.).
 Nouvelles Chansons politiques, 1838 (Paris, Ed. Pagnerre, 3rd ed., 1838) 

1811 births
1884 deaths
People from Issoire
Politicians from Auvergne-Rhône-Alpes
Moderate Republicans (France)
Members of the 1848 Constituent Assembly
19th-century French journalists
French male journalists
French chansonniers
19th-century French male writers